Sympistis anubis is a moth of the family Noctuidae.

Adults are on wing in late August.

External links
 Images at mothphotographersgroup

anubis
Moths of North America
Endemic fauna of California
Moths described in 2008
Fauna without expected TNC conservation status